Cecilia was a pop-rock band based in New York. The band was from the Washington, D.C. area, then later moved to Astoria, Queens. While not a religious group, the band chose the name Cecilia from Saint Cecilia, patron saint of music and of the blind.

History 
The band was formed by the members of the Veltz family, then living in Vienna, Virginia in 1998 when the three Veltz youngsters, Allison, Drew and Laura, began performing songs written by their father, Kenneth Veltz, at local venues. The group was originally an acoustic trio, playing local open mic gigs with Drew playing guitar for his sisters. When the family's financials were in a downturn, the band became the family business and Kenneth and mother Jeannie joined their children on drums and vocals, respectively. The group moved to New York in 2000. That same year they recorded Live at Zig's at two live performances in August, which was released in 2001.  After a string of temporary bassists, Cecilia added Kevin Jacoby in late 2000. Cecilia was in negotiations to join Blackbird Records an affiliate of Atlantic Records just before the merger of AOL and Time Warner, which ended Blackbird's affiliation with Atlantic. This led to Cecilia being signed by Atlantic Records in early 2001.

In the aftermath of September 11 the group recorded an EP entitled September in tribute to the firefighters lost. They donated the proceeds from the album sales to firefighter charities and the group devoted much of their work in benefit of firefighters at that time. After disagreements with Atlantic, the group parted ways with the label in the fall of 2002 before recording an album. The EP Off The Record (album) contains demo cuts for that never-recorded album. That same fall the band played a series of acoustic shows in the window of the Manhattan Theatre Source and later released a live album from those performances. In 2004 the band recorded their first complete studio album, This, through the help of fan funding. The band announced in late January 2006 that Kevin Jacoby would be leaving the band and at that time the final version of This had not yet been released. In September, 2006, This was released, under the band name The Veltz Family, rather than as Cecilia.

Cecilia has toured extensively on the eastern coast of the United States, with regular performances in both New York and Washington, DC areas.  Cecilia has shared the stage with other Virginia acts including Virginia Coalition, Pat McGee Band and Tim Reynolds, and performed at the legendary Wetlands Preserve before its closing in 2001.

Music 
The band's pop music sound is focused around the three-part vocal harmonies provided by lead singers Laura and Allison along with backing vocals by their mother Jeannie, which are reminiscent of the Indigo Girls and Mariah Carey. The vocals are supported by Drew's catchy lead guitar riffs, often evoking Dave Matthews and Tim Reynolds comparisons and Kevin Jacoby's melodic bass lines, often in the style of Fleetwood Mac's John McVie. Patriarch Ken plays drums as well as adding vocals and guitar parts (often simultaneously). Ken is known for playing a bare-bones "street kit" that includes a Djembe as an all-purpose drum.

The band's final lineup consisted of:
 Allison Veltz - lead vocal, percussion
 Drew Veltz - lead guitar
 Jeannie Veltz - vocals, percussion
 Ken Veltz - songwriter, drums, guitar, vocals
 Laura Veltz - songwriter, lead vocal, rhythm guitar, accordion, percussion
 Kevin Jacoby - bass

Discography 
 1999 - It Just Doesn't Matter
 1999 - Kitchen Mix
 2001 - Live @ Zig's
 2002 - September
 2002 - Off The Record
 2003 - Live @ The Source
 2006 - This (as The Veltz Family)

Follow-up 
 Allison and Laura lend their vocals to the Pat McGee Band track "Shady" from the band's 2004 release, Save Me.
 Lee Solomon (LoveBuzz, Soul Driver, Down Holly) was the band's bassist in the early days before Kevin Jacoby joined the band, but at times Drew would play bass on some songs while Ken simultaneously played drums and guitar, while singing background vocals.  
 Upon the announcement that Kevin Jacoby was leaving, the band has been "taking some time to re-configure."
 Laura is living in Nashville, Tennessee, working as a songwriter. She had four songs on the debut album of Eden's Edge, and a cut with Jana Kramer, "What I Love About (Your) Love". Her first tune released as a single, "Drunk Last Night", a co-write with Josh Osborne, charted at #1 for the Eli Young Band, shortly followed by "Live A Little", recorded by Dean Alexander, which also peaked at #1, and "Lonely Eyes", recorded by Chris Young, which reached #13. Laura has a co-publishing contract with Warner/Chappell, Nashville, and Big Machine Music, and often performs live in "writer's rounds".
 Allison has also relocated to Nashville. Like Laura, she performs frequently in the best of Nashville's many "listening room" venues. Allie independently produced her second EP, "The White Room", which was released in December, 2015. It was created as part of a Rockethub crowd-funding project, in conjunction with an OvationTV contest, with three winners to be awarded $5k additional funding, plus air-time on OvationTV. "Mr. Taxi", a song Allison co-wrote, was recorded by "Girls Generation" (aka SNSD), reaching #1 in Japan and South Korea in April 2011, with a chart run of 37 weeks. Blaster Records released Allison's debut single "Bright Side", in April, 2014, followed by a music video in June. Her debut EP "Welcome to Wonderland", also released on Blaster, in May, 2015, was co-produced by Dan Mukala, Allison's co-writer on "Bright Side", and Mark Bright, who has also produced Carrie Underwood, Rascal Flats, Keith Urban, and Shakira. 
 Ken and Jeannie are also in Nashville, still performing as an acoustic duo in small, intimate clubs, house concerts, and listening rooms.
 Drew is still alive.
 Kevin Jacoby (KJ) stayed in New York City and married costume designer Cora Levin. He returned to life as a freelance bass player, appearing live and on recordings with artists including La Mecanica Popular, Ato Essandoh, Chris London, Owen Brown, and Rocky Bryant of Average White Band. In 2017, KJ formed The Oddysy with DJ Johnny Juice of Public Enemy. The first single, Incantation, was produced by Scott Hull. The band plans to release their debut album in the spring of 2018. It will feature guest appearances by Darryl "DMC" McDaniels of Run DMC, Charlie Brown of Leaders of the New School, and Chuck D of Public Enemy.

Rock music groups from Washington, D.C.
Rock music groups from New York (state)
Rock music groups from Virginia
Musical groups established in 1999
1999 establishments in Virginia